Worthen is an unincorporated community in Galla Township, Pope County, Arkansas, United States. It is located at the intersection of US Route 64/Highway 247 (US 64/AR 247) and Edwards Road at the city limits of Pottsville.

References

Unincorporated communities in Pope County, Arkansas
Unincorporated communities in Arkansas